Labour and Co-operative Party (often abbreviated Labour Co-op) is a description used by candidates in United Kingdom elections who stand on behalf of both the Labour Party and the Co-operative Party.

Candidates contest elections under an electoral alliance between the two parties, that was first agreed in 1927. This agreement recognises the independence of the two parties and commits them to not standing against each other in elections. It also sets out the procedures for both parties to select joint candidates and interact at a local and national level.

There were 26 Labour and Co-operative Party MPs elected at the December 2019 election, making it the fourth largest political grouping in the House of Commons, although Labour and Co-operative MPs are generally included in Labour totals. The chair of the Co-operative Parliamentary Group is Preet Gill and the vice-chair is Jim McMahon.

Description
Labour and Co-operative is a joint description registered with the Electoral Commission, appearing alongside a candidate's name on ballot papers. When elected, the designation is officially Labour and Co-operative Party, with elected representatives often meeting together in addition to being part of an official Labour group. For example, MPs and peers are members of the Co-operative Parliamentary Group.

Most Labour and Co-operative candidates use the joint description but some stand under another version, particularly for local government elections and elections in Scotland, Wales and London that use a list system. In this case only one description will be used to avoid voters thinking Labour and Co-operative candidates are standing against Labour candidates; however, joint candidates are still recognised as part of the Labour and Co-operative Group if they are elected.

Labour and Co-operative candidates and representatives also use a joint logo on their printed materials and websites.

History

The Labour Party was founded in February 1900, followed in October 1917 by the Co-operative Party. Initially both parties operated independently, but saw each other as part of a broader movement, appealing to a similar voting base. At a local level, the parties began working together, with informal pacts to stand agreed candidates to maximise the vote for centre-left candidates. The first Co-operative Party MPs also took the whip of the much larger Labour Party upon entering the House of Commons.

Moves toward a formal national partnership began in 1925 with the creation of the 'Joint Committee of the Executive Committees of the Co-operative Party and Labour Party'. This Joint Committee drafted a formal agreement between the two parties that was ratified at the June 1927 Co-operative Congress at Cheltenham, becoming the first 'National Agreement', also known as the 'Cheltenham Agreement'.

The Agreement was updated a number of times throughout the twentieth century, deepening the partnership between the two parties and gradually removing restrictions that formed part of earlier versions, such as a limit on the number of joint candidates in elections. The most recent National Agreement was signed in 2003 and sets out the process for selecting candidates and how the two parties can work together locally and nationally.

See also
Labour Party
Co-operative Party
List of Labour Co-operative Members of Parliament

References

Co-operative Party
Centre-left parties in the United Kingdom
Organisation of the Labour Party (UK)
Political party alliances in the United Kingdom